Gobiopsis exigua is a species of goby of the genus Gobiopsis  found in the Western Central Pacific Ocean.

References

Gobiidae
Taxa named by Ernest A. Lachner
Taxa named by James F. McKinney
Fish described in 1979